Pepero (Korean name: 빼빼로, English name: chocolate-covered pretzel stick) is a thin cookie stick with compound chocolate dipped in the outer layer. Pepero is manufactured by Lotte Confectionery Corporation in South Korea since 1983. Cocoa mass and flour are the key components to make a package of Pepero. It is exported to about 64 countries worldwide and especially popular in Singapore, Malaysia, and Philippines. Pepero has been awarded numerous times in sales and designs.

Flavors 
As of 2021, Pepero is manufactured in several flavors:
 Chocolate (Original)
 Strawberry
 Almond (coated with chocolate)
 Nude (chocolate in the center with a biscuit coating on the outside; the other way around from an original chocolate pepero) 
 Nude Green Tea
 White Chocolate Cookie
 Black Chocolate Cookie
 Tiramisu Cheese
 Melon
 Peanut
 Double "Dip" White Chocolate (Two coatings instead of one)
 Double "Dip" Black Chocolate
 Blueberry Yogurt
 Cherry double dip
 Mint choco
Sweet potatoes
Green tea
Cheddar Cheese
Cream Cheese
Calamansi Yougurt
 Yakult Yoghurt
 Strawberry double dip
 Nude Cheddar cheese
 Dark chocolate (original)
 Peanut Butter
 Latte
Coconut Chocolate
Skinny Cacao
Choco Cookie
Peanut&Pretzel
Crunky
Pig Bar

Lotte also released a new version of Pepero, Pepero skinny, which is thinner and is "more crispy."

Marketing 
The most prominent marketing strategy that Lotte Confectionery Corporation implements is held annually on November 11. The marketing strategy company takes improves every year. Due to the COVID-19, sales have been difficult. Hence, the company made an adjustment in marketing by live broadcast and delivery. Lotte Confectionery Corporation launched an exotic ice cream ‘Pepero-bar’ in limited time. Ice cream ‘Pepero-bar’ has used the originality feature of Pepero by covering with almond and displaying “Pepero friends” character as packaging to attract consumers.

Sales 
About 60% of the annual Pepero sales occur around Pepero Day, which is held on November 11. Pepero sales have reached a record high of about 1.1 trillion won in terms of supply prices until 2016. Pepero has successfully settled in the market by advertising Pepero Day. On average, Pepero's daily sales on Pepero Day are about 84 times higher than usual. Lotte Confectionery Corporation actively participates in social contribution with its profits on Pepero since the sales increase every year. The major export regions such as Singapore, China, Russia, and the United States play a big stake in Pepero's sales.

Awards 

 Watsons Best Selling Snack Award- 2012
 Watsons Best Selling Biscuit Award- 2014
 Watsons Best Selling Korean Biscuit Award- 2015
 Germany's Red Dot Design Award- 2019
 Germany's iF Design Award- 2020

Social Contribution 
The company donates Pepero to needy neighbors and social organizations. With its record sales and profits, Lotte contributes to establish the local children’s center.

Criticism 
Pepero has been criticized for copying Pocky, which has been manufactured by Japan's Ezaki Glico Company since 1966. Lotte denies that it was inspired by the product. The Pocky product was introduced over 17 years before in the market. Ezaki Glico’s Pocky and Lotte Confectionery’s Pepero have a long history and known as rival companies in chocolate-covered stick (pretzel). Since the content of Pocky and Pepero is the same, it is difficult to distinguish the difference between the two products. Ezaki Glico filed a lawsuit against Lotte Confectionery about the trademark, and the shape of the originality of Pocky since Pocky has entered the United States market before Lotte Confectionery’s Pepero. Lotte Confectionery could design partially chocolate-based snacks in a different shape from Pocky. However, the court saw that only this factor could not offset the functionality of Pocky's design. Lotte Confectionery Corporation won the case because the judge concluded that Pocky’s product appearance cannot be protected by trade dress due to its functionality.

In 2014, Glico sued Lotte which allegedly copied packaging box design of Glico's Baton d'or exclusive series of Pocky and Pretz for Lotte's new product Premier Pepero. On 14 August 2015, Seoul district court ruled that Lotte stole the box design of Glico's products and the ruling is expected to force Lotte to halt its sales of the product and dispose of the existing stock.

On July 10, 2015, Glico filed a lawsuit in the U.S. District Court against Lotte USA for infringing on the trademarks of Pocky. Glico had registered the Pocky's three-dimensional trademarks prior to the launch of Pepero in the U.S.

Pepero Day 
The date is set to November 11, annually. Farmer’s Day is also held in November 11 and referred it as a Garae Tteok Day. Pepero Day was derived from a middle school girl student in Yeongnam district of South Korea. They exchanged Pepero by saying “Let’s be tall and skinny” with well-wishing remarks. Nowadays, couples make Pepero or purchase it from the market in exchange with their gratitude to convey affection. As Pepero day comes to date, the sales of manufacturing companies drastically increase.

References

External links 

 Lotte Confectinery Pepero Official Site (English)
Official Pepero Site (Korean)
 The Pepero Song+ flash
 Pepero Day sweet for food retailers (English)
 Sth Korea calendar laden with love (English)
 Big bucks in a youthful craze (English)
 Abundant `Special' Days Fatten Sales (English)

South Korean confectionery
South Korean brands